Britt Synnøve Johansen (born 23 June 1970) is a Norwegian female singer.

Biography
She was born in Haugesund, Rogaland, and started her musical career by singing in a choir for 7 years. She participated in a talent contest for new singers and got to the final. In 1989, she won the Melodi Grand Prix performing the song "Venners nærhet". Despite finishing 17th in the Eurovision Song Contest, she didn't finish her musical career. She participated in several shows like that in the Rogaland theater. She also performed in theatrical shows like Schrooge – en julefortelling.

In 2001, Synnøve recorded versions of Edith Piaf's songs in Paris and appeared in many shows of Piaf's cabaret, which had 15,000 spectators.
Between 2003 and 2004 she appeared as Eponine in the musical Les Misérables, in Bømlo in Hordaland.

She is married to Jan Zahl, brother of Geir Zahl from Kaizers Orchestra.

In 2010 she released an album of Norwegian tangos, titled "Skyt meg med tre roser", produced by Janove Ottesen from Kaizers Orchestra.

Discography
God morgen – 1990
Mot himmlen i Paris – Piaf på norsk- 2002 (she sings Édith Piaf´s songs in Norwegian)
Skyt meg med tre roser – 2010
På reis, på reis – 2017

References

External links

Eurovision Song Contest entrants for Norway
Eurovision Song Contest entrants of 1989
Musicians from Haugesund
Melodi Grand Prix winners
Living people
1970 births
21st-century Norwegian singers
21st-century Norwegian women singers